Clovelly Park is an inner southern suburb of Adelaide in the local government area of the City of Marion. Before becoming an 'advanced' suburb, it was a farm and vineyard. The suburb is bordered by Daws Road to the north, South Road to the east, Sturt Road to the south, and a combination of Percy Avenue and the Flinders railway line to the west. It is situated approximately 20 minutes from the Adelaide city centre, and about 2 minutes from Flinders University, Flinders Medical Centre and Westfield Marion.

Etymology 
Clovelly Park is named after the village in Devon, England of the same name.

History 
The original inhabitants of the area, the Kaurna, lived mainly along the Sturt River which passes several hundred metres to the south of the suburb's southern boundary. Richard Hamilton, whose family became major wine producers in the state, planted the first vineyard in the area in 1838, just two years after the colony of South Australia was founded. Settlers followed, planting vineyards, market gardens and almond orchards around the banks of the Sturt River and the creeks further to the north in what later became Clovelly Park.

Clovelly Park is situated on former Viaduct and Watts Creek. Following World War II, Clovelly Park was opened up for limited housing and the bitumising of roads began. Prior to widespread development in the mid 1950s, Clovelly Park remained a farming and agricultural region with a large number of vineyards and almond orchards. In 1955, Chrysler Australia purchased  of land in Clovelly Park and built a car assembly plant which was opened in 1964, and was, at the time, the largest such operation under one roof in the southern hemisphere. For several years following the establishment of the Chrysler plant, Clovelly Park was also often referred to as Chrysler Park, due to misprints in street directories incorrectly labeling the Clovelly Park railway station as Chrysler Park railway station.

The Clovelly Park Post Office opened on 15 November 1950 and was renamed St Marys in 1967.

During the 1960s, urban encroachment by the city of Adelaide enabled developers to build on the remaining farms, many bankrupted by rising land taxes and council rates. Created was a small semi-town very similar to that of modern-day Sellicks Beach or McLaren Vale. The late 1960s saw Clovelly Park and most other suburbs of Marion turn into a 'family friendly' establishment due to the introduction of parks, reserves, and in the 1970s, playgrounds. This establishment although toned down, stands today.

During the 1980s, Clovelly Park shifted to a more retail scene, with the opening or upgrading of a few major shopping centres in surrounding suburbs. Clovelly Park has now lost most of its "countryside" feel, but is still regarded as a safe family friendly neighbourhood.

The southern part of Clovelly Park was often called Tonsley Park. Chrysler, and later on Mitsubishi, referred to their 'Tonsley Park' plant This part of Clovelly Park (including the former Mitsubishi Motors Australia Limited (MMAL) plant) was separated and renamed Tonsley on 27 January 2017.

Schools and childcare 

The area contains a government primary school – Clovelly Park Primary School – which caters to approximately 300 students and includes a New Arrivals Program (NAP) for young migrant students. The nearest government secondary school is Mitchell Park's Hamilton Secondary College (formerly Mitchell Park Technical College). St Bernadette's School in St. Marys is a lower-primary Catholic school, teaching from reception to grade 5, and is located on the other (eastern) side of South Road. Sacred Heart College Middle School in Mitchell Park provides Catholic schooling for boys in grades 6–9, while Westminster School is an independent Uniting Church school catering for approximately 1000 students from reception to year 12, and is located in the nearby suburb of Marion.

There is no kindergarten within the suburb, but Mitchell Park Kindergarten is close by, and the suburb houses an ABC Learning Centre which provides childcare.

A plan to convert an existing shopping complex on South Road into an independent primary school for the Exclusive Brethren was initially approved by the City of Marion's Development Assessment Panel, before being successfully challenged in the Supreme Court by a local business owner.

Clovelly Park Primary School houses the office of Family Life SA which delivers programs and provides resources on sexuality education to schools around the state.

Finally, Clovelly Park was the location of the former Marion High School, established 1955, which closed in 1996. The old high school grounds were converted into a housing estate, but the school hall remains as a community centre.

Shopping 

An Aldi opened in Clovelly Park in 2020, and the Park Holme Shopping Centre is within walking distance of the residential portion of the suburb. In addition, South Road provides ready access to the CBD and to Castle Plaza in Edwardstown, while Westfield Marion in Oaklands Park possesses over 300 stores (with a forthcoming expansion increasing the number by an additional 90) and is readily accessible by road and public transport.

Parks and community halls 

The largest park within the suburb is Rosslyn Avenue Reserve, which sits between Rosslyn Avenue and Beverley Street at the northern end of the suburb. Rosslyn Avenue Reserve has a playground, seating and a playing area.

The Clovelly Park Reserve lies between Scottish and Australian Avenues. It features a playground, a community hall, electric barbecues and tennis courts that can be hired by the general public.

Slightly further south, on the site of the former Marion High School, sits Cosgrove Hall – the original school hall and gymnasium. The hall can be hired for a variety of purposes, and the site includes the Graham Watts Playground (completed in February 2006, and named after the long-serving local councillor), a basketball net and undercover seating. The hall can be found on the corner of York Street and Scott Avenue. (Officially opened September 2007). Cosgrove Hall is also the unofficial home of Zero1 Pro Wrestling Australia who run professional wrestling events at the Hall.
 
On the corner of Kensington Street and Windsor Avenue, just west of Cosgrove Hall, is situated Kensington Reserve. While it doesn't possess any play equipment, it does provide seating.

Byron Avenue Reserve, which resides next to the old Clovelly Park Scout Hall on Byron Avenue, encompasses 0.49 hectares which are in the process of being revegetated with pre-European flora. The reserve contains 200-year-old river red gums, and used to include Viaduct Creek before the creek was built over as part of the Chrysler/Mitsubishi development.

Finally, hidden behind units on Cohen Court and the southern end of Windsor Avenue is a small reserve containing seating and a playground.

Although not located in Clovelly Park, the adjacent Mitchell Park Reserve on Bradley Grove provides a full-sized playing oval, a community hall, tennis courts, barbecues, large open spaces and two playgrounds.

Health and community services 

Known as The Southern Clinic from 1959 to 1974, the Clovelly Park Community Health Centre provides health services for the area, with six medical doctors on staff. The clinic is open Monday to Saturday, and out-of-hours appointments can be organized for Sundays. Counseling and related services are available through the Inner Southern Community Health Service , which includes the Aboriginal Health House on the corner of Wingfield Street and Newton Avenue. More serious cases are handled at the Flinders Medical Centre, which is a short drive away and directly accessible by public transport.

The Marion St. John Ambulance station opened its doors on Sturt road in late 1965 to provide ambulance services and first aid services for community events. The Marion station area of operation initially covered O'Halloran Hill to Edwardstown and from the coast to the foothills, including Belair in the east. Many locals from the age of 11 began training as cadets in February of that year in order to man the station and ambulances were purchased through community fund-raising. In 1989, concern over the use of volunteers depriving them of overtime, weekend and shift work led paid ambulance officers to conduct significant industrial disruption, leading to the state Labor government handing the service and vehicles to the paid staff and the removal of volunteers. Paid officers from the Marion station collected the ambulances from the all-volunteer Blackwood station after their last shift at 8 am on Monday, 6 May 1991, which was the last use of a volunteer ambulance crew in Adelaide.

Notable residents 

 Dean Southgate, local doctor. Along with Dr Hugh Lloyd established The Southern Clinic in 1959 and was instrumental in gaining government support for The Southern Clinic to become a community health centre which was re-opened in 1974 as the Clovelly Park Community Health Centre.
 Robert Coulthard, local doctor and Member of the Order of Australia.
 Rosemary Crowley, Doctor at the Clovelly Park Community Health Centre from 1974 to 1982, Labor Senator for South Australia from 1983 to 2002.
 Shaun Micallef, comedian, ARIA award winner and host of Talkin' 'bout Your Generation.

Transport 

The suburb lies adjacent to South Road to the east, and Marion Road lies a short distance to the west. South Road is the main north–south arterial road in Adelaide, and thus it provides rapid access to a large portion of the city. Limited east-west travel is facilitated through Daws Road/Oaklands Road to the north and Sturt Road to the south.

Clovelly Park is well serviced by public transport. Frequent buses run along South Road, and both the 213 and 297 run through the center of the suburb. In addition, the northern residential portion of Clovelly Park is serviced by the Mitchell Park railway station on the Flinders railway line. The Seaford railway line, which provides more services than the Tonsley line, is close by and is accessible via the Ascot Park railway station to the north of the suburb.

Politics 

The suburb is part of the federal seat of Boothby held by Louise Miller-Frost and the state seats of Elder and Mitchell.

References

Suburbs of Adelaide